Barnaby George Courtney (born 17 November 1990) is an English singer, songwriter, and musician.

Early life 
Courtney was born in  England then moved with his family to Seattle, Washington when he was 4. He returned to the United Kingdom when 15. Courtney previously led the British indie band SleeperCell, which was featured on Channel 4's Orange Unsigned competition, before fronting the indie band Dive Bella Dive, which signed to Island Records and performed at the Download Festival in 2012.

After recording an album's worth of material for Island Records that was never released, Courtney was dropped by the label. Determined to pursue a career in music, but with no income or home, he supported himself by working at PC World while sleeping on friends' sofas and in his girlfriend's car.

Solo career
In 2015, Courtney released his first track as a solo artist, "Glitter & Gold", which received radio play on BBC Introducing Suffolk and by BBC Radio 1's Phil Taggert, and led to an appearance at Radio 1's Big Weekend in Exeter the following year. "Glitter & Gold" also reached #1 on the UK Spotify Viral Chart, and #2 on the iTunes Alternative Chart. Glitter & Gold" was later used in the trailer for the 2016 film The Founder starring Michael Keaton.

Also in 2015, "Fire" was featured in the Bradley Cooper movie Burnt and went on to receive airplay on American rock radio in 2016. "Fire" was later used in the advertisement of the 24th season of "Top Gear". To date, "Fire" has been streamed more than 68 million times on Spotify, while "Glitter & Gold" has been streamed more than 98 million times. Courtney played at the SXSW Music Festival in Austin, Texas, in a showcase for NME magazine in March 2016 and performed "Fire" on Conan O'Brien's TBS talkshow Conan in June. Another track, "Hobo Rocket", was included on the soundtrack of the EA Sports video game FIFA 17. In early 2017, the It's All Indie website selected Courtney as its #1 Sound of 2017.
The track 'Fire' has also featured on a 2019 advert for Peloton home spinning bikes.
Courtney has opened for artists including The Who, The Libertines, Ed Sheeran, The Lumineers, Tom Odell and Fitz and the Tantrums, and opened for Blur at the closing party for the 2016 Abu Dhabi Grand Prix. He is currently working on his first full-length album, and will be performing at the BottleRock Napa Valley festival in California, the Governors Ball Music Festival in New York and the LaureLive Music Festival in Cleveland, OH later in 2017.

Also in 2016 Barns Courtney played at the world famous Rock Werchter festival in Belgium on the KlubC stage.

In late January he also announced details of an extensive US headlining tour, in addition to the release of his debut EP, The Dull Drums. His song, ""Hellfire", was named as the official theme song for Extreme Rules in 2017.

In 2017, His song 'Kicks' was featured in Need for Speed Payback.

His song "Hands" was used in MLB The Show 17

His song "Fire" was used in the 2017 documentary We, the Marines, narrated by Gene Hackman.

Throughout the 2017 AFL season, the Hawthorn Football Club used "Glitter and Gold" with a highlights package over the ground public address system in the final 60 seconds before the start of home games.

In November 2017, the BBC used his song "Champion" for their Rugby League World Cup advertising campaign. As well as being used by WWE for their pay-per-view Backlash 2018.

He performed on Steve Angello's 2018 album Human on the song "Dopamine".

In May 2018, the Netflix series Safe used his song "Glitter & Gold" as its intro song. Additionally they used the track "Fire" as the credit track.

His song "Champion" is featured in the San Diego Studio video game MLB The Show 18.

His song "Hellfire" is featured on the first episode of the first season of Marvel's Cloak and Dagger, initially aired 7 June 2018.

Courtney is also credited as featuring on The Prodigy song "Give Me a Signal" from their new album No Tourists.

Courtney's song "Champion" was also used in the first gameplay trailer for the Battle Charge gameplay expansion for the popular battle royale shooter Apex Legends.

Courtney's song “Fun Never Ends” is featured on the soundtrack of the EA Sports video game NHL 20.

His song "Sinners" was used as the background music for the first trailer of the video game As Dusk Falls, presented on 23 July 2020.

Discography

Studio albums

EPs

Singles

Notes

Filmography

References

External links
 
 
 
 
 

21st-century English singers
English male singers
English rock singers
English songwriters
Capitol Records artists
Living people
Musicians from Ipswich
1990 births
Virgin Records artists
21st-century British male singers
British expatriates in the United States
British male songwriters